Union Township is one of the two townships of Butte County, South Dakota, United States; virtually all the rest of the county is unorganized territory.  It lies on the eastern edge of the county.

External links
Official map by the United States Census Bureau; Butte County listed on page 3

Townships in Butte County, South Dakota
Townships in South Dakota